Wawrzyniak is a Polish surname, and may refer to:

 Andrzej Wawrzyniak (born 1931), Polish diplomat and art collector
 Édouard Wawrzyniak (1912–1991), French footballer of Polish origin
 Jakub Wawrzyniak (born 1983), Polish footballer
 Martynka Wawrzyniak (born 1979), Polish photographer and model
 Piotr Wawrzyniak (1849–1910), Polish priest and activist
 Rashontae Wawrzyniak (born 1990), American beauty pageant titleholder
Stanley Wawrzyniak (1927–1995), American Marine and Navy Cross recipient
 Władysław Wawrzyniak (1890–1940), Polish military commander

Polish-language surnames